Candler Almshouses are  almshouses at 79 Amyand Park Road, Twickenham TW1 3HJ in the London Borough of Richmond upon Thames, England.

The ten almshouses are now managed by The Richmond Charities. New residents are accepted from 65 years of age.

The current almshouses were built in 1936. They are named after William Candler (1826–1907), a grocer in Twickenham who left money to build them. He is buried in Richmond Cemetery.

See also
List of almshouses in the United Kingdom

Notes and references

External links
The Richmond Charities

1936 establishments in England

Almshouses in London
Buildings and structures completed in 1936
History of the London Borough of Richmond upon Thames
Twickenham